Iris magnifica is a bulbous flowering plant in the genus Iris, in the subgenus Scorpiris. 
It is native to the mountains of Central Asia, including the Zarafshan Range in Uzbekistan.

This plant has gained the Royal Horticultural Society's Award of Garden Merit.

It has a known hybrid, Iris magnifica 'Agalik' (Vved), which flowers between April and May, in lavender-blue to white shades of colour. It also has an orange-tangerine crest.

References

magnifica
Plants described in 1935
Flora of Uzbekistan